Freezy Freakies were a winter fad in the early to mid-1980s. 

They were snow gloves, created by ski glove company Swany America that used thermocromic ink to reveal fun colors and designs when exposed to cold temperatures. The gloves came in many designs, which catered to young kids. Designs included a fighter plane and a pink castle scene.

References

Gloves
1980s fads and trends
Thermochromism